Magnesium alloys are mixtures of magnesium (the lightest structural metal) with other metals (called an alloy), often aluminium, zinc, manganese, silicon, copper, rare earths and zirconium.  Magnesium alloys have a hexagonal lattice structure, which affects the fundamental properties of these alloys. Plastic deformation of the hexagonal lattice is more complicated than in cubic latticed metals like aluminium, copper and steel; therefore, magnesium alloys are typically used as cast alloys, but research of wrought alloys has been more extensive since 2003. Cast magnesium alloys are used for many components of modern automobiles and have been used in some high-performance vehicles; die-cast magnesium is also used for camera bodies and components in lenses.

Practically, all the commercial magnesium alloys manufactured in the United States contain aluminium (3 to 13 percent) and manganese (0.1 to 0.4 percent). Many also contain zinc (0.5 to 3 percent) and some are hardenable by heat treatment.
All the alloys may be used for more than one product form, but alloys AZ63 and AZ92 are most used for sand castings, AZ91 for die castings, and AZ92 generally employed for permanent mold castings (while AZ63 and A10 are sometimes also used in the latter application as well). For forgings, AZ61 is most used, and here alloy M1 is employed where low strength is required and AZ80 for highest strength. For extrusions, a wide range of shapes, bars, and tubes are made from M1 alloy where low strength suffices or where welding to M1 castings is planned. Alloys AZ31, AZ61 and AZ80 are employed for extrusions in the order named, where increase in strength justifies their increased relative costs.

Magnox (alloy), whose name is an abbreviation for "magnesium non-oxidizing", is 99% magnesium and 1% aluminium, and is used in the cladding of fuel rods in magnox nuclear power reactors.

Magnesium alloys are referred to by short codes (defined in ASTM B275) which denote approximate chemical compositions by weight. For example, AS41 has 4% aluminum and 1% silicon; AZ81 is 7.5% aluminium and 0.7% zinc.  If aluminium is present, a manganese component is almost always also present at about 0.2% by weight which serves to improve grain structure; if aluminum and manganese are absent, zirconium is usually present at about 0.8% for this same purpose. Magnesium is a flammable material and must be handled carefully.

Designation 

Magnesium alloys names are often given by two letters following by two numbers. Letters tell main alloying elements (A = aluminium, Z = zinc, M = manganese, S = silicon). Numbers indicate respective nominal compositions of main alloying elements. Marking AZ91 for example conveys magnesium alloy with roughly 9 weight percent aluminium and 1 weight percent zinc. Exact composition should be confirmed from reference standards.

The designation system for magnesium alloys is not as well standardized as in the case of steels or aluminium alloys; most producers follow a system using one or two prefix letters, two or three numerals, and a suffix letter. The prefix letters designate the two principal alloying metals according to the following format developed in ASTM specification B275, as shown in the table at right.

Aluminium, zinc, zirconium, and thorium promote precipitation hardening: manganese improves corrosion resistance; and tin improves castability. Aluminium is the most common alloying element. The numerals correspond to the rounded-off percentage of the two main alloy elements, proceeding alphabetically as compositions become standard. Temper designation is much the same as in the case of aluminium. Using –F, -O, -H1, -T4, -T5, and –T6.
Sand permanent-mold, and die casting are all well developed for magnesium alloys, die casting being the most popular. Although magnesium is about twice as expensive as aluminium, its hot-chamber die-casting process is easier, more economical, and 40% to 50% faster than cold-chamber process required for aluminium. As these temperatures are easily attained and generally do not require a protective atmosphere, many formed and drawn magnesium products are manufactured. The machinability of magnesium alloys is the best of any commercial metal, and in many applications, the savings in machining costs more than compensate for the increased cost of the material. It is necessary, however, to keep the tools sharp and to provide ample space for the chips. Magnesium alloys can be spot-welded nearly as easily as aluminium, but scratch brushing or chemical cleaning is necessary before the weld is formed. Fusion welding is carried out most easily by processes using an inert shielding atmosphere of argon or helium gas. Considerable misinformation exists regarding the fire hazard in processing magnesium alloys. It is true that magnesium alloys are highly combustible when in a finely divided form, such as powder or fine chips, and this hazard should never be ignored. Above , a non-combustible, oxygen-free atmosphere is required to suppress burning. Casting operations often require additional precautions because of the reactivity of magnesium with sand and water in sheet, bar, extruded or cast form; however, magnesium alloys present no real fire hazard.

Thorium-containing alloys are not usually used, since a thorium content of more than 2% requires that a component be handled as a radioactive material, although thoriated magnesium known as Mag-Thor was used in military and aerospace applications in the 1950s.

Magnesium alloys are used for both cast and forged components, with the aluminium-containing alloys usually used for casting and the zirconium-containing ones for forgings; the zirconium-based alloys can be used at higher temperatures and are popular in aerospace.  

Magnesium+yttrium+rare-earth+zirconium alloys such as WE54 and WE43 (the latter with composition Mg 93.6%, Y 4%, Nd 2.25%, 0.15% Zr) can operate without creep at up to 300C and are reasonably corrosion-resistant.

Trade names have sometimes been associated with magnesium alloys. Examples are:
 Elektron
 Magnox
 Magnuminium
 Mag-Thor
 Metal 12
 Birmabright
 Magnalium

Cast alloys 
Magnesium casting proof stress is typically 75–200 MPa, tensile strength 135–285 MPa and elongation 2–10%. Typical density is 1.8 g/cm3 and Young's modulus is 42 GPa. Most common cast alloys are:
 AZ63
 AZ81
 AZ91
 AM50
 AM60
 ZK51
 ZK61
 ZE41
 ZC63
 HK31
 HZ32
 QE22
 QH21
 WE54
 WE43
 Elektron 21

Wrought alloys 
Magnesium wrought alloy proof stress is typically 160-240 MPa, tensile strength is 180-440 MPa and elongation is 7-40%. The most common wrought alloys are:
 AZ31
 AZ61
 AZ80
 Elektron 675
 ZK60
 M1A
 HK31
 HM21
 ZE41
 ZC71 ZM21  AM40  AM50  AM60  K1A  M1  ZK10  ZK20  ZK30  ZK40

Wrought magnesium alloys have a special feature. Their compressive proof strength is smaller than tensile proof strength. After forming, wrought magnesium alloys have a stringy texture in the deformation direction, which increases the tensile proof strength. In compression, the proof strength is smaller because of crystal twinning, which happens more easily in compression than in tension in magnesium alloys because of the hexagonal lattice structure.

Extrusions of rapidly solidified powders reach tensile strengths of up to 740 MPa due to their amorphous character, which is twice as strong as the strongest traditional magnesium alloys and comparable to the strongest aluminium alloys.

Compositions table

Characteristics 
Magnesium's particular merits are similar to those of aluminium alloys: low specific gravity with satisfactory strength. Magnesium provides advantages over aluminium, in being of even lower density (approx. 1800 kg/m3) than aluminium (about 2800 kg/m3). The mechanical properties of magnesium alloys tend to be below those of the strongest of the aluminium alloys.

The strength-to-weight ratio of the precipitation-hardened magnesium alloys is comparable with that of the strong alloys of aluminium or with the alloy steels. Magnesium alloys, however, have a lower density, stand greater column loading per unit weight and have a higher specific modulus. They are also used when great strength is not necessary, but where a thick, light form is desired, or when higher stiffness is needed. Examples are complicated castings, such as housings or cases for aircraft, and parts for rapidly rotating or reciprocating machines. Such applications can induce cyclic crystal twinning and detwinning that lowers yield strength under loading direction change.

The strength of magnesium alloys is reduced at somewhat elevated temperatures; temperatures as low as  produce considerable reduction in the yield strength. Improving the high-temperature properties of magnesium alloys is an active research area with promising results.

Magnesium alloys show strong anisotropy and poor formability at room temperature stemming from their hexagonal close-packed crystal structure, limiting practical processing modes. At room temperature, basal plane slip of dislocation and mechanical crystal twinning are the only operating deformation mechanisms; the presence of twinning additionally requires specific loading conditions to be favorable. For these reasons processing of magnesium alloys must be done at high temperatures to avoid brittle fracture.

The high-temperature properties of magnesium alloys are relevant for automotive and aerospace applications, where slowing creep plays an important role in material lifetime.  Magnesium alloys generally have poor creep properties; this shortcoming is attributed to the solute additions rather than the magnesium matrix since pure magnesium shows similar creep life as pure aluminum, but magnesium alloys show decreased creep life compared to aluminum alloys.  Creep in magnesium alloys occurs mainly by dislocation slip, activated cross slip, and grain boundary sliding.   Addition of small amounts of zinc in Mg-RE alloys has been shown to increase creep life by 600% by stabilizing precipitates on both basal and prismatic planes through localized bond stiffening. These developments have allowed for magnesium alloys to be used in automotive and aerospace applications at relatively high temperatures.  Microstructural changes at high temperatures are also influenced by Dynamic recrystallization in fine-grained magnesium alloys.

Individual contributions of gadolinium and yttrium to age hardening and high temperature strength of magnesium alloys containing both elements are investigated using alloys containing different Gd:Y mole ratios of 1:0, 1:1, 1:3, and 0:1 with a constant Y+Gd content of 2.75 mol%. All investigated alloys exhibit remarkable age hardening by precipitation of β phase with DO19 crystal structure and β phase with BCO crystal structure, even at aging temperatures higher than 200 °C. Both precipitates are observed in peak-aged specimens. The precipitates contributing to age hardening are fine and their amount increases as Gd content increases, and this result in increased peak hardness, tensile strength and 0.2% proof stress but decreased elongation. On the other hand, higher Y content increases the elongation of the alloys but results in decreased strength.

Despite the active nature of the metal, magnesium and its alloys have good resistance to corrosion in air at STP. The rate of corrosion is slow compared with rusting of mild steel in the same atmosphere. Immersion in salt water is problematic, but a great improvement in resistance to salt-water corrosion has been achieved, especially for wrought materials, by reducing some impurities particularly nickel and copper to very low proportions or using appropriate coatings.

Fabrication

Hot and cold working 
Magnesium alloys harden rapidly with any type of cold work, and therefore cannot be extensively cold formed without repeated annealing. Slow forming gives better results than rapid shaping. Press forging is preferred to hammer forging, because the press allows greater time for metal flow. Metal worked outside this range is easily broken due to lack of available deformation mechanisms.

Casting 
Magnesium alloys, especially precipitation-hardened alloys, are used in casting. Sand, permanent mold and die casting methods are used, but plaster-of-Paris casting has not yet been perfected. Sand casting in green-sand molds requires a special technique, because the magnesium reacts with moisture in the sand, forming magnesium oxide and liberating hydrogen. The oxide forms blackened areas called burns on the surface of the casting, and the liberated hydrogen may cause porosity. Inhibitors such as sulfur, boric acid, ethylene glycol, or ammonium fluoride are mixed with the damp sand to prevent the reaction. All gravity-fed molds require an extra high column of molten metal to make the pressure great enough to force gas bubbles out of the casting and make the metal take the detail of the mold. The thickness of the casting wall should be at least 5/32 in. under most conditions. Extra-large fillets must be provided at all re-entrant corners, since stress concentration in magnesium castings are particularly dangerous.
Permanent mold castings are made from the same alloys and have about the same physical properties as sand castings. Since the solidification shrinkage of magnesium is about the same as that of aluminium, aluminium molds can often be adapted to make magnesium-alloy castings (although it may be necessary to change the gating).
Pressure cold-chamber castings are used for quantity production of small parts. The rapid solidification caused by contact of the fluid metal with the cold die produces a casting of dense structure with excellent physical properties. The finish and dimensional accuracy are very good, and machining is necessary only where extreme accuracy is required. Usually these castings are not heat treated.

Welding, soldering, and riveting 
Many standard magnesium alloys are easily welded by gas or resistance-welding equipment, but cannot be cut with an oxygen torch. Magnesium alloys are not welded to other metals, because brittle inter-metallic compounds may form, or because the combination of metals may promote corrosion. Where two or more parts are welded together, their compositions must be the same. Soldering of magnesium alloys is feasible only for plugging surface defects in parts. The solders are even more corrosive than with aluminium, and the parts should never be required to withstand stress. Riveted joints in magnesium alloy structures usually employ aluminium or aluminium-magnesium alloy rivets. Magnesium rivets are not often used because they must be driven when hot. The rivet holes should be drilled, especially in heavy sheet and extruded sections, since punching tends to give a rough edge to the hole and to cause stress concentrations.

Machining 
A particular attraction of magnesium alloys lies in their extraordinarily good machining properties, in which respect they are superior even to screwing brass. The power required in cutting them is small, and extremely high speeds (5000 ft per min in some cases) may be used. The best cutting tools have special shapes, but the tools for machining other metals can be used, although somewhat lower efficiency results. When magnesium is cut at high speed, the tools should be sharp and should be cutting at all times. Dull, dragging tools operating at high speed may generate enough heat to ignite fine chips. Since chips and dust from grinding can therefore be a fire hazard, grinding should be done with a coolant, or with a device to concentrate the dust under water. The magnesium grinder should not be used also for ferrous metals, since a spark might ignite the accumulated dust. If a magnesium fire should start, it can be smothered with cast-iron turnings or dry sand, or with other materials prepared especially for the purpose. Water or liquid extinguishers should never be used, because they tend to scatter the fire. Actually, it is much more difficult to ignite magnesium chips and dust than is usually supposed, and for that reason they do not present great machining difficulties. The special techniques that must be used in fabricating magnesium (working, casting, and joining) add considerably to the manufacturing cost. In selecting between aluminium and magnesium or a given part, the base cost of the metal may not give much advantage to either, but usually the manufacturing operations make magnesium more affordable.  There is, perhaps, no group of alloys where extrusion is more important than it is to these, since the comparatively coarse-grained structure of the cast material makes most of them too susceptible to cracking to work by other means until sufficient deformation has been imparted to refine the grain. Therefore, except for one or two soft alloys, machining is invariably a preliminary step before other shaping processes.

Hot extrusion 
Not much pure magnesium is extruded, for it has somewhat poor properties, especially as regards its proof stress. The alloying elements of chief concern at present are aluminium, zinc, cerium and zirconium; manganese is usually also present since, though it has little effect on the strength, it has a valuable function in improving corrosion resistance. One important binary alloy, containing up to 2.0% manganese, is used extensively for the manufacture of rolled sheet. It is comparatively soft and easier to extrude than other alloys, and is also one of the few that can be rolled directly without pre-extrusion.
In the UK, extrusions are made from billets of  dia. On presses varying in power over the range 600-3500 tons; normal maximum pressures on the billet are 30-50 tons/sq. in the U.S the Dow chemical company have recently installed a 13.200 ton press capable of handling billets up to 32 in.  Extrusion technique is generally similar to that for aluminium base alloys but, according to Wilkinson and fox, die design requires special consideration and, in their opinion, should incorporate short bearing lengths and sharp die entries. Tube extrusion in alloys AM503, ZW2, and ZW3 is now made with bridge dies. (The aluminium-bearing alloys do not weld satisfactorily.) In contrast to the previous practice of using bored billets, mandrel piercing is now used in the extrusion of large diameter tubes in ZW3 alloy.

The stiffness of the alloys towards extrusion is increased in proportion to the amount of hardening elements they contain, and the temperature employed is generally higher the greater the quantity of these. Billet temperatures are also affected by the size of the sections, being higher for heavy reductions, but are usually in the range . Container temperatures should be identical with, or only slightly higher than billet temperature. Pre-heating of the billets must be carried out uniformly to promote as far as possible a homogeneous structure by absorption of compounds, such as Mg4Al, present in the alloys.

Fox points out and this is also applicable to aluminium alloys. The initial structure of the billet is important, and casting methods that lead to fine grain are worthwhile. In coarse material, larger particles of the compounds are present that are less readily dissolved, and tend to cause a solution gradient. In magnesium alloys, this causes internal stress, since solution is accompanied by a small contraction, and it can also influence the evenness of response to later heat treatment.

The binary magnesium-manganese alloy (AM505) is readily extruded at low pressures in the temperature range ., the actual temperature used depending upon the reduction and billet length rather than the properties desired, which are relatively insensitive to extrusion conditions. Good surface condition of the extrusion is achieved only with high speeds, of the order of 50–100 ft. per minute.

With the aluminium and zinc containing alloys, and particularly those with the higher aluminium contents such as AZM and AZ855 difficulties arise at high speeds due to hot-shortness.
Under conditions approaching equilibrium magnesium is capable of dissolving about 12 per cent aluminium, but in cast billets 4-5 per cent usually represents the limit of solubility. Continuous casting improves the homogeneity of these alloys and water cooling of the dies or taper heating of the billets further facilities their extrusion.

Introduction of the magnesium-zinc-zirconium alloys, ZW2 and ZW3, represents a considerable advance in magnesium alloy technology for a number of reasons. They are high strength, but, since they do not contain aluminium, the cast billet contains only small quantities of the second phase. However, the mechanical properties are sensitive to billet preheating time, temperature and extrusion speed, Long preheating times and high temperatures and speeds produces properties similar to those in older aluminium-containing alloys, Heating times must be short and temperatures and speeds low to produce high properties. Increasing zinc content to 5 or 6 per cent, as in the American alloy ZK60 and ZK61, reduces sensitivity to extrusion speed in respect of mechanical properties.

Alloying of zirconium-bearing materials has been a major problem in their development. It is usual to add the zirconium from a salt—and careful control can produce good results. Dominion Magnesium Limited in Canada have developed a method adding in the conventional manner through a master alloy.

Explanation for the low extrusion rates necessary to successfully extrude some magnesium alloys does not lie outside reasons put forward for other metals. Altwicker considers that the most significant cause is connected. With the degree of recovery from crystal deformation, which is less complete when work is applied quickly, causing higher stresses and the exhausting of the capacity for slip in the crystals. This is worthy of consideration, for the speed of re-crystallization varies from one metal to another, and according to temperature. It is also a fact that a metal worked in what is considered its working range can frequently be made to show marked work hardening if quenched immediately after deformation—showing that temporary loss of plasticity can easily accompany rapid working.

Further alloy development
Scandium and gadolinium have been tried as alloying elements; an alloy with 1% manganese, 0.3% scandium and 5% gadolinium offers almost perfect creep resistance at 350C.  The physical composition of these multi-component alloys is complicated, with plates of intermetallic compounds such as Mn2Sc forming. Addition of zinc to Mg-RE alloys has been shown to greatly increase creep life by stabilizing RE precipitates.  Erbium has also been considered as an additive.

Magnesium–lithium alloys 
Adding 10% of lithium to magnesium produces an alloy that can be used as an improved anode in batteries with a manganese-dioxide cathode. Magnesium-lithium alloys are generally soft and ductile, and the density of 1.4 g/cm3 is appealing for space applications.

Quantum mechanical simulations have been used to predict the formation of ordered magnesium–lithium alloys. Of interest relative to manufacturing, it is predicted that addition of more than 13 at. % lithium results in ordered phases with a cubic structure.

Non-combustible magnesium alloys 
Adding 2% of calcium by weight to magnesium alloy AM60 results in the non-combustible magnesium alloy AMCa602. The higher oxidation reactivity of calcium causes a coat of calcium oxide to form before magnesium ignites. The ignition temperature of the alloy is elevated by 200–300 K. An oxygen-free atmosphere is not necessary for machining operations.

References 

 
Aluminium–magnesium alloys